Yediel Canton (born October 1, 1986, in Jaca, Spain) is a Spanish figure skater. He is the 2004 Spanish national bronze medalist.

External links
 

Spanish male single skaters
1986 births
Living people